"Work That" is a song by American R&B artist Mary J. Blige. It was written by Blige, Sean Garrett, and Theron Feemster, featuring production by the latter, for her eighth studio album, Growing Pains (2007). "Work That" was released as the album's second single, and was sent to urban radio stations on December 18, 2007. A remix featuring Busta Rhymes was also released to radio. 

When it was available as a digital download, the single was still not officially released, but did eventually reach number 65 on the US Billboard Hot 100. 

"Work That" was featured in an iTunes commercial.

The song received additional exposure in 2019 and 2020 after Senator Kamala Harris selected it as the campaign song for her presidential campaign. Harris frequently used it as a walkout song, including her victory speech after being elected vice president in the 2020 United States presidential election.

Charts

Weekly charts

Year-end charts

References

2008 singles
Mary J. Blige songs
Songs written by Sean Garrett
Songs written by Mary J. Blige
Song recordings produced by Theron Feemster
2007 songs
Geffen Records singles
Songs written by Theron Feemster